Orthocomotis pactoana is a species of moth of the family Tortricidae. It is found in Pichincha Province, Ecuador.

The wingspan is 23 mm. The ground colour of the forewings is white cream, tinged with grey in the dorsal area and somewhat scaled with dark brown and orange scales. The markings are dark brown. The hindwings are greyish brown.

Etymology
The species name refers to the type locality, Pacto, Ecuador.

References

Moths described in 2007
Orthocomotis